Märkische Heide is a municipality in the district of Dahme-Spreewald in Brandenburg in Germany.

Demography

Song

"Märkische Heide" or "Brandenburg Lied" is the title of a well-known German song, whose text mainly praises the beauty of the local countryside. The Chilean military song Mi fusil y yo adopted its melody.

References

Localities in Dahme-Spreewald